Roberto Reinaldo Cáceres González (April 16, 1921 – January 13, 2019) was a Uruguayan Prelate of Roman Catholic Church.

Biography 
Cáceres was born in Buenos Aires, Argentina and was ordained a priest on July 15, 1945. Cáceres was appointed bishop of The Diocese of Melo on January 2, 1962, and consecrated on March 19, 1962. Cáceres retired from the Melo Diocese on April 23, 1996.

References

External links
Catholic-Hierarchy

1921 births
2019 deaths
20th-century Roman Catholic bishops  in Uruguay
Argentine expatriates in Uruguay
20th-century Argentine Roman Catholic priests
Bishops appointed by Pope John XXIII
Participants in the Second Vatican Council
Clergy from Buenos Aires
Roman Catholic bishops of Melo